Jill Pike (born July 13, 1980) is an American businesswoman and executive, currently Vice President of Communications at Vox Media. A former political commentator and former activist, Pike was one of the original hosts of the talk radio show The Young Turks on Air America Radio. Pike was later deputy director of public affairs for the think tank Third Way. In 2017, she became the Vice President of Public Affairs at the NFL.

Pike occasionally substitute hosted The Young Turks when either Cenk Uygur or Ben Mankiewicz were absent. Her roles on the show included booking guests and participating in the chat room.  She formerly co-hosted an Internet-only broadcast following the show called  Absolute Truth. Pike has been a political opinion contributor to ABC News.

Pike has a B.A. in Television Production from Loyola Marymount University. Her father is American television and movie producer John S. Pike.

References

1980 births
Living people
American talk radio hosts
American women radio presenters
People from Los Angeles
People from Washington, D.C.
Women National Football League executives
The Young Turks people
Loyola Marymount University alumni